A. Ganeshkumar (sometimes spelled Ganesh Kumar) (born 26 April 1984) is an Indian politician and was a member of the 14th Tamil Nadu Legislative Assembly from the Gingee constituency. He represented the Pattali Makkal Katchi party.

The elections of 2016 resulted in his constituency being won by K. S. Masthan.

A. Ganeshkumar was born in Chennai on 26 April 1984 and has a M.E., Ph.D. degree.

References 

1984 births
Politicians from Chennai
Pattali Makkal Katchi politicians
Living people
Tamil Nadu MLAs 2011–2016